Steven Henry Jarvis (born April 22, 1968) is an American politician who is a Republican member of the North Carolina Senate, having been initially elected in 2020. He represents the 29th district. He previously served as county commissioner of Davidson County, North Carolina and as a member of the North Carolina House of Representatives, serving the 80th district from 2019 until 2021.

Electoral history

2022

2020

2018

References

|-

|-

Living people
1968 births
People from Anderson, Indiana
Politicians from Anderson, Indiana
People from Lexington, North Carolina
University of North Carolina at Chapel Hill alumni
21st-century American politicians
County commissioners in North Carolina
Republican Party members of the North Carolina House of Representatives
Republican Party North Carolina state senators